Alin Sorin Ilin (born 18 July 1984) is a Romanian former footballer who played for teams such as Dinamo București, Jiul Petroșani, Progresul București, UTA Arad or CS Tunari, among others. Currently, he is the assistant manager of Liga III side CS Tunari.

External links
 
 

1984 births
Living people
Footballers from Bucharest
Romanian footballers
Association football midfielders
Liga I players
Liga II players
FC Dinamo București players
CSM Jiul Petroșani players
FC Progresul București players
FC UTA Arad players
AFC Săgeata Năvodari players
FC Metaloglobus București players
ASC Daco-Getica București players